NICI may refer to:
National Information and Communications Infrastructure, a program initiative of UNECA in Africa
Nijmegen Institute for Cognition and Information, a Dutch research institute
NICI AG, a German toy manufacturer
 Negative ion Chemical ionization, now more frequently abbreviated NCI, a mode of operation of a gas chromatography - mass spectrometry (GC-MS) system that allows molecules resolved by GC to be measured as negative ions by MS. 
 National Innovative Capacity Index

See also
Lia Nici, British politician